In New Zealand, a special vote or special declaration vote is a vote made by an elector who is unable to cast an ordinary vote because they are unable to visit a polling place in their own electorate or, the elector is not on the electoral roll.

Special votes can be made by anyone who: 
 is outside of their electorate, and the polling booth is not equipped to take ordinary votes for their electorate.
 enrolled to vote after Writ Day (31 days before election day)
 is not on the printed electoral roll they believe they should be
 is on the unpublished roll
 is ill or infirm and cannot get to a polling place
 is a prisoner on remand
 can satisfy the returning officer that going to a polling place would cause hardship or serious inconvenience
 is in hospital
 is overseas

Advance ordinary voting became available at the 2011 election, so people who cannot attend a polling booth on election day can cast their vote early without having to cast a special vote.

Those in another electorate can cast a special vote at any polling place, after filling in a form explaining their reason for needing a special vote. Special polling places are set up in hospitals, maternity homes and rest homes and voting can take place in these places on election day. Voters who are overseas or otherwise unable to vote on election day, and do not have access to a hospital polling place, can vote by mail. Some New Zealand High Commissions and Embassies provide polling places.

External links
 Special voting at Elections New Zealand
 Election 2020: Special votes explained
 Advance voting at Elections New Zealand
 Overseas voting at Elections New Zealand

Elections in New Zealand
Politics of New Zealand
Voting